A research university or a research-intensive university is a university that is committed to research as a central part of its mission. They are the most important sites at which knowledge production occurs, along with "intergenerational knowledge transfer and the certification of new knowledge" through the awarding of doctoral degrees. They can be public or private, and often have well-known brand names. 

Undergraduate courses at many research universities are often academic rather than vocational and may not prepare students for particular careers, but many employers value degrees from research universities because they teach fundamental life skills such as critical thinking. Globally, research universities are overwhelmingly publicly funded, with notable exceptions being the United States and Japan (although public institutions still predominate).

Institutions of higher education that are not research universities or do not aspire to that designation, such as liberal arts colleges, instead place more emphasis on student instruction or other aspects of tertiary education, and their faculty members are under less pressure to publish or perish.

History

19th century

Roger L. Geiger, "the leading historian of the American research university," has argued that "the model for the American research university was established by five of the nine colonial colleges chartered before the American Revolution (Harvard, Columbia, Yale, Princeton, and Pennsylvania); five state universities (Michigan, Wisconsin, Minnesota, Illinois, and California); and five private institutions conceived from their inception as research universities (MIT, Cornell, Johns Hopkins, Stanford, and Chicago)." The American research university first emerged in the late 19th century, when these fifteen institutions began to graft graduate programs derived from the German model onto undergraduate programs derived from the British model.

20th century
Research universities were essential to the establishment of American hegemony by the end of the 20th century. Most importantly, Berkeley, Chicago, Columbia, and Princeton directly participated in the creation of the first nuclear weapons (the Manhattan Project).  Besides that, Columbia and Harvard were instrumental in the early development of the American film industry (Hollywood), MIT and Stanford were leaders in building the American military–industrial complex and developing artificial intelligence, and Berkeley and Stanford played a central role in the development of Silicon Valley.

Since the 1960s, American research universities, especially the leading American public research university system, the University of California, have served as models for research universities around the world. Having one or more universities based on the American model (including the use of English as a lingua franca) is a badge of "modernity and social progress" for the contemporary nation-state. The Americans' continued dominance into the early 21st century has forced their European counterparts to confront the urgent need for reform to avoid "declining into an advanced form of feeder colleges for the best American universities."

Characteristics

John Taylor, Professor of Higher Education Management at the University of Liverpool, defines the key characteristics of successful research universities as:
 "Presence of pure and applied research"
 "Delivery of research-led teaching"
 "Breadth of academic disciplines"
 "High proportion of postgraduate research programmes"
 "High levels of external income"
 "An international perspective"

Philip Altbach defines a different, although similar, set of key characteristics for what research universities need to become successful:
 At the top of the academic hierarchy in a differentiated higher education system and receiving appropriate support
 Overwhelmingly public institutions
 Little competition from non-university research institutions, unless these have strong connections to the universities
 More funding than other universities to attract the best staff and students and support research infrastructure
 Adequate and sustained budgets
 Potential for income generation from student fees and intellectual property
 Suitable facilities
 Autonomy
 Academic freedom

A 2012 National Academies of Sciences, Engineering, and Medicine report defined research universities, in the American context, as having values of intellectual freedom, initiative and creativity, excellence, and openness, with such additional characteristics as:
 Being large and comprehensive – Clark Kerr's "multiversity"
 Emphasizing the undergraduate residential experience (flagged specifically as distinguishing American research universities from those in continental Europe)
 Integrating graduate education with research
 Having faculty engaged in research and scholarship
 Conducting research at high levels
 Having enlightened and bold leadership

Global university rankings use metrics that primarily measure research to rank universities. Some also have criteria for inclusion based on the concept of a research university such as teaching at both undergraduate and postgraduate level and conducting work in multiple faculties, QS World University Rankings, or teaching undergraduates, having a research output of more than 1000 research papers over 5 years, and no more than 80% of activity in a single subject area, Times Higher Education World University Rankings.

Worldwide distribution
The QS World University Ranking for 2021 included 1002 research universities. The region with the highest number was Europe, with 39.8%, followed by Asia/Pacific with 26.7%, the US and Canada with 15.6%, Latin America with 10.8% and the Middle East and Africa with 7%. All regions except the Middle East and Africa were represented in the top 100. The largest number of new entrants to the rankings were from East Asia and Eastern Europe, followed by Southern Europe. By individual country, the US has the most institutions with 151, followed by the UK with 84, China with 51, and Germany with 45. The top 200 shows a similar pattern with the US having 45 universities, the UK 26 and Germany 12. By comparison, the Carnegie Classification of Institutions of Higher Education (2015) identifies 115 US universities as "Doctoral Universities: Highest Research Activity" and a further 107 as "Doctoral Universities: Higher Research Activity", while Altbach estimated that there were around 220 research universities in the US in 2013.

The Academic Ranking of World Universities shows a similar distribution, with 185 of their 500 ranked institutions in 2020 coming from Europe, 161 from the Americas, 149 from Asia/Oceania and five from Africa. All regions except Africa are represented in the top 100, although the Americas are represented solely by universities from the US and Canada. In 2022, the US has the most universities in the top 500 from a single country, 127, followed by China with 83, the UK with 38 and Germany with 31. The top 200 shows the similar pattern: the US with 62 followed by China with 30 and the UK with 21. 

The Times Higher Education only gives a breakdown by country and only for its top 200; this again has the U.S. at the top with 58, followed by the UK with 28, Germany with 22, and China with 11. The top 200 features one university from Africa, the University of Cape Town in South Africa, but none from Latin America. The U.S. News & World Report Best Global Universities Ranking 2021 gives numbers by country for the 1500 universities ranked from 86 countries: the U.S. is again top, with 255, followed by China with 176 and the UK with 87. The 2020 CWTS Leiden Ranking includes 1,176 universities in the rankings from 65 countries: China tops the list for the first time, with 204, followed by the U.S. with 198, the UK with 58 and Germany with 54.

See also
 History of European research universities
 List of research universities in South Korea
 List of research universities in the United States

References

Higher education
Types of university or college